The Hemispherectomy Foundation is a 501(c)(3) non-profit organization founded to provide a support structure for children, and the families of children who have had or are preparing to have hemispherectomy brain surgery. The foundation also provides scholarships for college, trade schools, and summer camps, as well as financial assistance and other support as needed. It is based in Aledo, Texas.

History 
The Hemispherectomy Foundation was founded in 2008, when a six-year-old girl, Jessie Hall, was hospitalized with Rasmussen's Encephalitis at Johns Hopkins Hospital.   Jessie was undergoing hemispherectomy surgery (removal or disconnection of one-half of the brain) to control continuous seizures.

Although The Hemispherectomy Foundation is based in the United States of America, it provides support globally.

Ben Carson, M.D., director of pediatric neurosurgery, at Johns Hopkins Hospital in Baltimore, Maryland, is the honorary chair of the foundation's medical advisory board.  He assumed this position in January, 2009.

References

External links
The Hemispherectomy Foundation: Official Website

Medical and health foundations in the United States
Organizations for children with health issues
Non-profit organizations based in Texas